was a Japanese actress and voice actress. She also performed by the stage name Stella Soga.

Life and career

Early life and family 
Machiko was born on March 18, 1938, in Hachioji, Tokyo, Japan. She had a humble upbringing and was raised to be a singer, though her talents were with acting. Her mother died when she was a child; she was raised by her father. She had two brothers and a sister. One of her brothers died during the Second World War; the other is still alive. Her father died of cancer in 1991.

She studied at Tokyo Metropolitan Minamitama High School. During high school, she was best at science and mathematics and made her own lotions. She decided to pursue a career in acting to overcome stage fright after she failed a chemistry presentation at school. She later graduated from Tokyo Announce Academy. In 1973, she went to study in Italy for two years.

Career 
She was “discovered” after doing a play in Tokyo Center. From that night on, her life would forever change as she met many important figures in the world of Japanese television.

She made her debut on NHK's children's show Minna issho in 1956. After taking jazz dance lessons for a number of years, her first roles were mainly radio and voice character roles. After appearing in NHK's radio drama Chorinmura to Kurumi no Ki (1961), she gained fame as the first voice actress to portray the lovable ghost Q-taro in Obake no Q-tarō (TBS, 1965–1968).

She appeared in numerous tokusatsu films and series and played many villainous roles in the Super Sentai franchise such as Queen Hedrian in Denziman and Sun Vulcan. She also appeared in Maskman portraying Tube Empire's field commander, Baraba's mother for one episode, as well as the evil sorceress Bandora in Zyuranger, better known to audiences in English speaking countries as Rita Repulsa in the American adaptation of Zyuranger, Power Rangers. In an odd twist, she soon found herself re-dubbing her own lines as Rita when Power Rangers was broadcast in Japan after the show became a surprise hit in America. Her final tokusatsu role was Magiel, Queen of the Sky Saints in Magiranger, which incidentally was one of her few non-villainous roles. In her memory, the producers of Power Rangers: Mystic Force used footage of Soga as Magiel to depict a reformed Rita Repulsa in the two-part final episode of Mystic Force, “Mystic Fate”.

In 1983, she opened an antiques shop in Harajuku, Tokyo, as a side-business alongside her acting career, inspired by her antique art collection hobby.

Her very final role was in the PlayStation 2 game Space Sheriff Spirits as the voice and the “face” of Ankoku Ginga Jyoou (Dark Galaxy Queen), last boss and original character of this game inspired to the 80s Metal Hero series. Soga also played the voices of Cyborg 007 in the 1968 Cyborg 009 anime series and the sidekick Ball Boy in 1984 series Machineman. Machiko also ran her own shop, selling jewellery, antique clothing, and tapestries among other goods.

Death 
In early August 2005, it was revealed that she had been diagnosed with pancreatic cancer about two years earlier. On the morning of May 7, 2006, she was found dead by a friend visiting her home. She was 68 years old. Her interment was in Fuchū, Tokyo's Tama Cemetery.

Appearances

Super Sentai/Power Rangers

 Battle Fever J (1979, Episode: 3) - Death mask Monster (voice)
 Denshi Sentai Denjiman (1980-1981, 51 episodes) - Queen Hedrian
 Denshi Sentai Denjiman: The Movie (1980) - Queen Hedrian
 Taiyo Sentai Sun Vulcan (1981-1982, 47 episodes) - Queen Hedrian
 Hikari Sentai Maskman (1987, Episode: 30) - Laraba - Barabas's mother
 Kyōryū Sentai Zyuranger (1992-1993, 49 episodes) - Witch Bandora
 Mighty Morphin Power Rangers (1993-1994, 63 episodes) - Rita Repulsa (via Kyōryū Sentai Zyuranger footage)
 Mahou Sentai Magiranger (2006, Episodes: 48 & 49) - Heavenly Arch Saint Magiel
 Power Rangers: Mystic Force (2006, Episodes: 31 & 32) - Mystic Mother (via Mahou Sentai Magiranger footage)
 Shuriken Sentai Ninninger (2015) - Witch Ninja Madam Spider (via Jiraiya's photo archive footage)

Metal Hero

 Uchū Keiji Gavan (1982, Episode: 21) - Honey Manda (Double Girl disguise) (voice)
 Uchū Keiji Sharivan (1983, Episode: 22) - Shinigami Beast (voice)
 Sekai Ninja Sen Jiraiya (1988-1989, 11 episodes) - Witch Ninja Madam Spider
 Jikuu Senshi Spielban (1986-1987, 44 episodes) - Queen Pandora
 VR Troopers (1996) - Desponda (via Jikuu Senshi Spielban footage)

Other works
 Kamen Rider Stronger (1975, Episodes: 27, 29 & 30) - Doctor Kate (voice)
 Batten Robomaru (1982, 51 episodes) - Batten Robomaru (voice)
 West Night
 Hiroshima
 Later It Fell
 Forever
 5-nen 3-kumi Mahō-gumi (Bellbara the Witch)
 Domuraishi-tachi
 Kugatsu no Sora (Yoshida's mother)
 Miyo-chan no Tame nara: Zen'in Shūgō!!
 Pretty Invader Milli (Steradian)
 Warrior of Love, Rainbowman (God Iguana)
 Seiun Kamen Machineman (1984, 36 episodes) - Ballboy (voice)
 Tōmei Dori-chan (Kikuko Shirakawa)
 TV Champion
 Zatoichi Kenka Daiko (AKA: Samaritan Zatoichi)

Anime TV series 
 Obake no Q-taro (first voice of Q-taro)
 Cyborg 009 (1966 series) (voice of Cyborg 007: Great Britain)
 Microid S (voice of Mamezō)
 Hana no PyunPyun Maru (voice of Kemeko)
 Kabatotto (voice of Totto)

Anime films 
 Cyborg 009 (1968 movie) (voice of Cyborg 007: Great Britain)
 Maken Liner 0011: Henshin Seiyo! (voice of Liner)

Games 
 Tengai Makyou: Daishi no Mokushiroku
 Space Sheriff Spirits (voices of Dark Galaxy Queen, Honey Manda, and Mitsubachi Doubler (Double Girl))

Songs 
 Obake no Q-taro (Obake no Q-taro 8 songs: opening, ending and insert songs)
 Batten Robomaru (Batten Robomaru 3 songs: opening and insert songs)
 Nazo no Onna B
 Majo wa Ijiwaru (5-nen 3-gumi mahogumi ending song)
 Ball Boy no uta (Seiun Kamen Machineman insert song)
 Dora! Majo Bandora no theme (Kyōryū Sentai Zyuranger insert song)
 Ankoku Ginga Jyoou no Blues  (Space Sheriff Spirits insert song)

Radio 
 Million Nights (Nazo no Onna B)

See also
Wayne Allwine
Dana Hill
Betty Lou Gerson
Jim Varney
Howard Morris
Joe Ranft
Alan Young

References

External links 
 
 Soga Machiko Collection: Stella (in Japanese)

1938 births
2006 deaths
Actresses from Tokyo
Japanese film actresses
Japanese television actresses
Japanese video game actresses
Japanese voice actresses
Deaths from cancer in Japan
Deaths from pancreatic cancer
20th-century Japanese actresses
20th-century Japanese women singers
20th-century Japanese singers
21st-century Japanese actresses
21st-century Japanese women singers
21st-century Japanese singers